The Prislop is a right tributary of the river Doftana in Romania. It discharges into the Doftana in Trăisteni.

References

Rivers of Romania
Rivers of Prahova County